Diacolax cucumariae is a species of medium-sized sea snail, a marine gastropod mollusk in the family Eulimidae. This is the only known species to exist within the family, Diacolax.

References

External links
 To World Register of Marine Species

Eulimidae
Gastropods described in 1946